Phu Tho Indoor Sport Stadium is a multi-purpose indoor arena, located in District 11, Ho Chi Minh City, Vietnam, within walking distance from the 1932-built Phú Thọ Horse Racing Ground. The stadium was constructed for 2003 Southeast Asian Games. Although not officially recognized, the stadium is usually home to Vietnam national futsal team. It has a capacity of 5,000 people for sporting events and a full-house capacity of around 8,000.

History

The stadium was built in 2000 along with a practice venue. It was opened on November 20, 2003 and has served major sporting as well as entertainment and exhibition events.

Notable events

Sports events

Entertainment events

References

Indoor arenas in Vietnam
Sports venues completed in 2003
Sports venues in Ho Chi Minh City
Taekwondo venues
2003 establishments in Vietnam
2003 Southeast Asian Games